Outpost is an animated short film, directed by Chuck Jones and first released in August, 1944. It is part of the Private Snafu series. As in all the Snafu films, the voice of Private Snafu is performed by Mel Blanc.

Plot 

A narrator informs viewers that the United States maintains far-flung military outposts, occupied by diligent sentinels. The film then introduces an outpost on a tiny Pacific island, where under its single palm tree lies the local sentinel, Private Snafu. His only companion is a local bird. Snafu loudly complains about his 249 days on the island without getting involved in any fighting, and a message coming over the radio informs him that his 249th request for a transfer has been denied.

Snafu and this bird get to sleep and dream about girls. Their dreams get mixed up and irate Snafu wakes up, threatening to break the bird for insubordination. The dejected bird locates a floating can of food, eager to eat the contents until he learns it is "Pickled Fish Eyes with Rice". Disgusted, he nearly throws the can out before noticing the bottom text: "Hon. K Ration Imperial Japanese Navy." Snafu is not interested in the bird's finding, and orders the bird to bury it. The United States military is tracking a Japanese task force by means of reference points until the observation posts lose track of it, so the officers call all observation posts to give a full report.  Private Snafu does so by reciting his day's seemingly mundane records from his log book; when his superiors hear of the tin-can entry in Snafu's report, they radio him again almost immediately, ordering Snafu to repeat the tin-can entry and confirm its description.  The bird digs it up and Snafu reports its food label and Japanese information. American bombers quickly arrive and bomb the Japanese fleet into oblivion.

The day ends with Snafu and his bird sitting on their tiny beach; with Snafu unaware of the Japanese fleet being annihilated, he again remarks his boredom. "Pickled fish eyes with rice; I don't get it. Wouldn't you think they could find something important for me to do in this here army?" as he throws the can into the ocean and the day ends.

Analysis 
This is considered a transitional film in the series, with Snafu successfully able to complete a mission despite his discomfort and being unaware of the importance of the task.

Sources

References

1944 films
1944 animated films
Short films directed by Chuck Jones
Films set on islands
Private Snafu
Articles containing video clips
American black-and-white films
1944 comedy films
1940s Warner Bros. animated short films
1940s American films